Qaemabad (also Romanized as Qā’emābād; also known as Deh Lārī, Gha’em Abad, Qā’īmābād, and Shahrak-e Qā’emābād) is a village in Ekhtiarabad Rural District, in the Central District of Kerman County, Kerman Province, Iran. At the 2006 census, its population was 2,207, in 515 families.

References 

Populated places in Kerman County